Long Island National Cemetery is a United States National Cemetery located in Suffolk County, New York. It is surrounded by a group of other separate cemeteries and memorial parks situated along Wellwood Avenue (County Road 3) – these include Pinelawn Memorial Park, St. Charles / Resurrection Cemeteries, Beth Moses, New Montefiore and Mt. Ararat Cemeteries. Its mailing address is Farmingdale (postal code 11735).  It borders East Farmingdale along its western edge and is located within the CDPS of Wyandanch (to the east), in the Town of Babylon, and Melville (to the north) in the Town of Huntington. Administered by the United States Department of Veterans Affairs, it encompasses , and as of 2021, had more than 357,000 interments.

In 2016 it was listed on the National Register of Historic Places.

History 
At the time the only National Cemetery in the area was Cypress Hills National Cemetery in Brooklyn, and it had very limited area available. The land was developed and burials began in March 1937. Within its first 8 years, it saw over 10,000 interments from World War II.

A section of the cemetery has the interments of World War II prisoners of war, including 37 Germans and 54 Italians.  There are also 35 British Commonwealth servicemen buried here from the same war.

Notable monuments 
  A granite memorial to "Fallen Comrades of Nassau & Suffolk Counties" was erected in 1940.

Notable interments 
 Medal of Honor recipients
 Seaman First Class Heinrich Behnke (1882–1952), for peacetime service aboard USS Iowa
 Corporal Anthony Casamento (1920–1987), for action at the Battle of Guadalcanal during World War II
 Gunner's Mate Third Class John Everetts (1877–1956), for peacetime service aboard USS Cushing
 Gunner's Mate Third Class Robert Galbraith (1878–1949), for action in the Philippine–American War
 Boatswain's Mate William Henry Gowan (1884–1957), for peacetime service in Coquimbo, Chile
 Captain Sydney G. Gumpertz (1879–1971), for action in World War I
 Chief Watertender August Holtz (1871–1938), for peacetime service aboard USS North Dakota
 Pl Sgt Joseph R. Julian (1918–1945), for action on Iwo Jima
 First Lieutenant Stephen Edward Karopczyc (1944–1967), for action in the Vietnam War
 Specialist Five John James Kedenburg (1946–1968), for action in the Vietnam War
 Private First Class Carlos James Lozada (1946–1967), for action at the Battle of Dak To during the Vietnam War
 Landsman Thomas Mitchell (1857–1942), for peacetime service aboard USS Richmond
 Chief Boatswain's Mate Lauritz Nelson (1860–1941), for action aboard USS Nashville during the Spanish–American War
 Sergeant Alfred B. Nietzel (1921–1944),for action in World War II
 First Lieutenant Bernard James Ray (1921–1944), for action in World War II
 Staff Sergeant Joseph Edward Schaefer (1921–1994), for action in World War II
 Second Lieutenant Charles William Shea (1921–1994), for action in World War II
 Private First Class William Henry Thompson (1927–1950), for action in the Korean War
 Private Michael Valente (1895–1976), for action in World War I
 Seaman James Aloysius Walsh (1897–1960), for action aboard USS Florida during the US occupation of Veracruz, Mexico
 First Lieutenant John Earl Warren (1946–1969), for action in the Vietnam War
 Others
 Count Basie, jazz musician
 Frank John Becker, US Congressman, World War I veteran
William Breitenbach, New York assemblyman, World War I veteran
 Captain Lewis Broadus, Buffalo Soldier, veteran of the Spanish–American War, Philippean–American War, and World War I
 Albert W. Brosch, professional golfer and World War II veteran
 Captain Leon Dabo, artist, World War I veteran
 Henry Dumas, writer and poet
 Alice Coltrane, jazz musician
 John Coltrane, jazz musician
 Mignon G. Eberhart, author
 James Fay, US Congressman, World War I veteran
 Enya Gonzalez, singer
 Maurice Gosfield, comic actor and voice of Benny the Ball in Top Cat
 Helen Kane, singer and model for Betty Boop
 Granville 'Stick' McGhee, musician
 Lionel Monagas, actor, World War I veteran
 Jules Munshin, comedian, actor
 William Redfield, actor, WWII infantryman
 Frank Silvera, actor
 Joe Simon, comic book writer and artist, co-creator of Captain America
 Zutty Singleton, jazz musician
 Richard J. Tonry, US Congressman, World War I veteran
 Roy J. Waldron, racehorse trainer who won the 1940 Kentucky Derby

See also

 List of cemeteries in New York
 National Register of Historic Places listings in Babylon (town), New York
 National Register of Historic Places listings in Huntington (town), New York

References

External links 

  National Cemetery Administration
  Long Island National Cemetery
  
  
 

United States national cemeteries
1936 establishments in New York (state)
Tourist attractions in Suffolk County, New York
Cemeteries in Suffolk County, New York
Cemeteries on the National Register of Historic Places in New York (state)
National Register of Historic Places in Suffolk County, New York
Historic American Landscapes Survey in New York (state)
Babylon (town), New York